Dover Township is one of twenty-five townships in Bureau County, Illinois, USA. As of the 2020 census, its population was 490 and it contained 252 housing units.

Geography

Cities
 Dover (west three-quarters)
 Princeton (north edge)

Unincorporated towns
 Greenoak
 Limerick

Cemeteries
The township contains six cemeteries:
 Dover
 Heatons Point
 Limerick
 Mason
 Pioneer
 Prairie Repose

Major highways
  US Route 34
  Illinois Route 26

Landmarks
 City Co Park

Demographics
As of the 2020 census there were 490 people, 212 households, and 136 families residing in the township. The racial makeup of the township was 93.67% White, 0.00% African American, 0.82% Native American, 0.20% Asian, 0.00% Pacific Islander, 1.22% from other races, and 4.08% from two or more races. Hispanic or Latino of any race were 4.29% of the population.

There were 212 households, out of which 28.80% had children under the age of 18 living with them, 63.68% were married couples living together, none had a female householder with no spouse present, and 35.85% were non-families. 34.90% of all households were made up of individuals, and 13.20% had someone living alone who was 65 years of age or older. The average household size was 2.20 and the average family size was 2.84.

The township's age distribution consisted of 23.8% under the age of 18, 1.3% from 18 to 24, 16.1% from 25 to 44, 38.7% from 45 to 64, and 20.2% who were 65 years of age or older. The median age was 48.2 years. For every 100 females, there were 86.4 males. For every 100 females age 18 and over, there were 112.6 males.

The median income for a household in the township was $82,727, and the median income for a family was $89,348. Males had a median income of $73,839 versus $45,875 for females. The per capita income for the township was $35,906. About 4.4% of families and 10.9% of the population were below the poverty line, including 5.4% of those under age 18 and 31.9% of those age 65 or over.

Political districts
 Illinois's 11th congressional district
 State House District 74
 State Senate District 37

References
 
 US Census Bureau 2007 TIGER/Line Shapefiles
 United States National Atlas

External links
 City-Data.com
 Illinois State Archives

Townships in Bureau County, Illinois
Populated places established in 1849
Townships in Illinois
1849 establishments in Illinois